These are the official results of the Women's shot put event at the 1994 European Championships in Helsinki, Finland. There were a total number of 20 participating athletes, with two qualifying groups and the final held at Helsinki Olympic Stadium on 7 August 1994.

Medalists

Final

Qualifying round
Held on 7 August 1994

Participation
According to an unofficial count, 20 athletes from 13 countries participated in the event.

 (1)
 (1)
 (3)
 (1)
 (3)
 (1)
 (1)
 (1)
 (2)
 (1)
 (1)
 (2)
 (2)

See also
 1991 Women's World Championships Shot Put (Tokyo)
 1992 Women's Olympic Shot Put (Barcelona)
 1993 Women's World Championships Shot Put (Stuttgart)
 1994 Shot Put Year Ranking
 1995 Women's World Championships Shot Put (Gothenburg)
 1996 Women's Olympic Shot Put (Atlanta)
 1997 Women's World Championships Shot Put (Athens)

References

 Results

Shot put
Shot put at the European Athletics Championships
1994 in women's athletics